The 1980 United States presidential election in Kansas took place on November 4, 1980. All 50 states and The District of Columbia were part of the 1980 United States presidential election. State voters chose seven electors to the Electoral College, who voted for president and vice president.

Kansas had gone Republican in the previous ten presidential elections except for Lyndon B. Johnson's 1964 landslide, although Carter's 7.5-point defeat in 1976 was the second-best performance for a Democrat in that period. Carter and Ronald Reagan both won landslides in the state’s early April presidential primaries, in Reagan’s case this being aided strongly by the support of Sunflower State Senator Bob Dole. By July it was clear that the economic frustration of Kansas’ farmers, who had due to a major drought given unusual support to Carter in 1976, would turn them and the state further towards Reagan than it had been in 1976. Although Reagan and Carter campaigned heavily in neighboring Jackson County, Missouri during October – spending time in both Independence and the Missouri section of Kansas City where they sparred over the Iran hostage crisis – neither candidate campaigned over the Kansas state line.

Kansas was won by former California Governor Ronald Reagan (R) by a margin of 24.56 points. As had previously occurred in 1952, 1956 and 1968, the Republican nominee won every county except urbanised and substantially black Wyandotte. Kansas has remained a reliably Republican state, and the last Democratic presidential candidate to carry the state was Lyndon Johnson in 1964.

Results

Results by county

See also
 United States presidential elections in Kansas
 Presidency of Ronald Reagan

References

Kansas
1980
1980 Kansas elections